Alan Cavendish Irwin (20 February 1889 – 2 July 1970) was an Australian rules footballer who played for the Essendon Football Club and St Kilda Football Club in the Victorian Football League (VFL).

Notes

External links 

		

1889 births
1970 deaths
Australian rules footballers from Melbourne
Essendon Football Club players
St Kilda Football Club players
People from Moonee Ponds, Victoria